Nupharin A is an ellagitannin found in Nuphar japonica. It is a molecule with three gallic acid units and one hexahydroxydiphenic acid unit attached to a glucose residue. It is an isomer of punicafolin and tellimagrandin II.

References 

Ellagitannins